Smyriodes trigramma, the stippled line-moth, is a species of moth of the family Geometridae first described by Oswald Bertram Lower in 1892. It is found over most of the non-tropical regions of Australia.

The wingspan is about 30 mm.

The larvae feed on Eucalyptus species.

References

Nacophorini